FK Labunishta (FK Labuništa) is a football club based in the village of Labuništa near Struga, North Macedonia. They are recently competing in the Macedonian Second League (West Division).

History
The club was founded in 2011.

Current squad
As of 5 August 2020

References

External links
Club info at MacedonianFootball 
Football Federation of Macedonia 

Labunishta
Association football clubs established in 2011
2011 establishments in the Republic of Macedonia
FK